Sapopemba may refer to:
 Subprefecture of Sapopemba, a subprefecture of the city of São Paulo, Brazil
 Sapopemba (district of São Paulo)
 Sapopemba (São Paulo Metro), a São Paulo Metro monorail station